Ramagiri is one of the villages in Pitchatur Mandal, Chittoor District, Andhra Pradesh State in India. Ramagiri is located 76.85 km distance from its District Main City Chittoor.

References

Villages in Chittoor district